The twenty-fifth series of the British reality television programme The Only Way Is Essex began airing on 1 September 2019, and concluded on 10 November 2019 following 11 episodes. The first episode of the series marks the 300th overall episode of the show. Ahead of the series, it was announced that former Love Island star Olivia Attwood had joined the cast having already made an appearance during the previous series. Frankie Sims and Matt Snape also joined the cast for this series. This series also featured one-off appearances from former cast members Charlie Sims, Danni Armstrong, Elliott Wright, Gemma Collins and Vas Morgan. In October 2019, it was announced that Sam Mucklow and Shelby Tribble had quit the series. During the final episode, it was confirmed that a "The Only Way Is Essexmas" special would return having not aired the previous year.

This series included newly single Lockie and Yaz attempting to move on with their lives, Frankie and Harry beginning their relationship but hitting some hurdles on the way, and Bobby looking for love. It also featured the breakdown of Clelia and Shelby's friendship as well as the ongoing feud between Ella and Chloe Brockett.

Cast

Episodes

{| class="wikitable plainrowheaders" style="width:100%; background:#fff;"
! style="background:#05E177;"| Seriesno.
! style="background:#05E177;"| Episodeno.
! style="background:#05E177;"| Title
! style="background:#05E177;"| Original air date
! style="background:#05E177;"| Duration
! style="background:#05E177;"| UK viewers

|}

Ratings
Catch-up service totals were added to the official ratings.

References

The Only Way Is Essex
2019 British television seasons